The 2008–09 CHL season was the 17th season of the Central Hockey League (CHL).

League business
The Rapid City Rush were added and two teams were ceased, the Austin Ice Bats and Youngstown SteelHounds.

Regular season

Conference standings

Note: y - clinched conference title; x - clinched playoff spot; e - eliminated from playoff contention

Playoffs

Playoff Bracket

CHL awards
Source:Central Hockey League Historical Award Winners

References

External links
Central Hockey League website

Central Hockey League seasons
CHL